The Black Hussar is a 1932 German historical drama film directed by Gerhard Lamprecht and starring Bernhard Goetzke, Conrad Veidt, Mady Christians, and Wolf Albach-Retty. It premièred at the Ufa-Palast am Zoo on 12 October 1932, part of a whole string of 'patriotic' movies released in the late days of the Weimar Republic.

The film's sets were designed by the art directors Robert Herlth and Walter Röhrig. It was short at the Babelsberg Studios and on location around Schwedt in Brandenburg.

Plot
In 1812, during the French period, large parts of Germany are occupied by the troops of Napoleon. Several paramilitary Freikorps units battle the French forces, among them the Black Brunswickers led by the 'Black Duke' Frederick William of Brunswick-Wolfenbüttel. After the War of the Fifth Coalition, the Black Hussars are pursued by Napoleon throughout the country, but frequently take refuge with the noble-minded German people.

While the Duke has taken a passage to the Isle of Wight, his cavalry officer (Rittmeister) Hansgeorg von Hochberg and his friend Lieutenant Aribert von Blome hide away in an inn with two young women. They hear of the plans evolved by the French governor Darmont to abduct Duke Frederick William's bride, Princess Marie of Baden, to marry her to the Polish prince Potovski.

Main cast
Conrad Veidt as Rittmeister Hansgeorg von Hochberg
Mady Christians as Marie Luise
Wolf Albach-Retty as Leutnant Aribert von Blome
Ursula Grabley as Brigitte
Otto Wallburg as Governor Darmont
Bernhard Goetzke as Duke Friedrich Wilhelm von Braunschweig
Günther Hadank as Captain Fachon, adjutant
Gregori Chmara as Prince Potovski
Fritz Greiner as Corporal

References

External links

1930s historical drama films
Films of the Weimar Republic
German historical drama films
Films directed by Gerhard Lamprecht
Napoleonic Wars films
German black-and-white films
Films set in 1812
Films shot in Germany
UFA GmbH films
Films shot at Babelsberg Studios
1930s German-language films
Films scored by Eduard Künneke
1930s German films